Neil Dorfsman (born May 31, 1952) is an American sound engineer and record producer, best known for his work with Dire Straits, Bruce Hornsby, Mark Knopfler, Paul McCartney and Sting. He won Grammy Awards for Best Producer for Bruce Hornsby's Scenes from the Southside (1988) and Sting's ...Nothing Like the Sun (1987), a Grammy Award for Best Engineer for Dire Straits' Brothers in Arms (1985), as well as a nomination for Best Engineer for Dire Straits's Love Over Gold (1982). Further, he recorded two tracks on Sting's Brand New Day (1999), which won a Grammy Award for Best Pop Album. He mixed the East Village Opera Company's Olde School, which received a Grammy Nomination  for Best Classical Crossover Album in 2009. In 1988 and 1998, Dorfman won a TEC Award for Engineer of the Year.

Other popular artists Dorfsman has worked with include Björk, Paul Brady, Def Leppard, Bonnie Tyler, They Might Be Giants, Richie Sambora, and Tears for Fears.

Dorfsman was born in Manhattan and grew up on Long Island. His career began at Electric Lady Studios in 1977, where he was trained by Eddie Kramer. After two years, he moved to Power Station Studios, where he became a staff engineer in 1979. His big break came in May, when he was assigned to take over for Bob Clearmountain, who had a prior commitment, on album #5 for Bruce Springsteen. One year and 60+ songs later, recording was finally completed for the double LP, "The River."

In the last decade, Dorfsman has made his residence in the San Diego area of California.

Selected works

Neil Dorfsman has worked on over 300 albums
 2014 The Album Collection, Vol. 1: 1973-1984 - Bruce Springsteen - Engineer
 2013 The Complete Album Collection, Vol. 1 - Bob Dylan - Engineer
 2012 Grégoire Maret - Grégoire Maret - Mixing
 2012 Live/Stone Blue - Foghat - Remixing
 2011 The Best of 25 Years  - Sting - Mixing, Producer
 2011 Wonderland - Original Broadway Cast - Engineer, Mixing
 2010 De Mares y Visiones: Canciones de Una Década - Manolo García - Mixing
 2010 The Collection 1973-84 - Bruce Springsteen - Engineer
 2009 Animal Grace/Walking Through Fire - April Wine - Mixing
 2009 Great Vacation, Vol. 1: Super Best of Glay - Glay - Mixing
 2009 Greatest Hits - Bruce Springsteen - Engineer
 2009 Handel's Messiah Rocks - Joyful Noise - Engineer
 2009 No Surrender - Kane - Engineer
 2008 Ikons - Kiss - Engineer
 2008 Olde School - The East Village Opera Company - Mixing
 2008 Revolutions in Sound: Warner Bros. Records - The First 50 Years - Producer
 2008 Saldremos a la Lluvia - Manolo García - Mixing
 2008 The Other Side of Me - Linda Eder - Engineer
 2007 In the Moment- Bob Mintzer - Engineer
 2007 Volta - Björk - Engineer, Mixing
 2006 Kiss Alive! 1975-2000 - Kiss - Engineering
 2006 Révérence - Henri Salvador - Engineer, Mixing
 2006 Soapbox Heroes - Enter the Haggis - Engineer, Mixing, Producer
 2006 Surrounded - Björk - Engineer
 2005 From the Ground Up - Antigone Rising - Engineer, Mixing, Producer
 2005 Private Investigations: The Best of Dire Straits & Mark Knopfler - Dire Straits - Producer
 2005 Romeo Rodney - Rodney Dangerfield - Engineer, Mixing
 2005 The Best of Bob Dylan - Bob Dylan - Engineer
 2005 The East Village Opera Company - The East Village Opera Company - Engineer, Producer
 2004 All the Best - Tina Turner - Producer
 2004 Dedication/On the Line - Gary "U.S." Bonds - Engineer, Mixing
 2004 Everybody Loves a Happy Ending - Tears for Fears - Engineer
 2004 Faster Than the Speed of Night/Secret Dreams & Forbidden Fire - Bonnie Tyler- Engineer, Mixing
 2004 Greatest Radio Hits - Bruce Hornsby - Producer
 2004 Medúlla - Björk - Engineer
 2003 Late Harvest - Serah - Engineer
 2003 Songs of Love - Sting - Composer
 2003 That Great Love Sound [UK CD] - The Raveonettes - Engineer
 2003 The Chain Gang of Love - The Raveonettes - Engineer
 2003 The Essential Bruce Springsteen - Bruce Springsteen - Engineer
 2002 Anthology - Carly Simon - Engineer
 2002 At the Movies - Sting - Mixing, Producer
 2002 Beyond Words - Bobby McFerrin - Engineer, Mixing
 2002 Favorite Enemy - Eman - Engineer, Mixing
 2002 Happy Times Ten - Hampton the Hampster - Engineer, Mixing
 2002 Nobody Knows: The Best of Paul Brady[Compass] - Paul Brady - Engineer, Mixing, Percussion, Producer
 2002 The Edge of Silence - Solas - Arranger, Engineer, Mixing, Producer
 2001 Back to the Island: Reggae From Martha's Vineyard - Engineer
 2000 A Collection: Step by Step/Paradox- Steps Ahead - Engineer
 2000 Best of Art Farmer in the CTI Years - Art Farmer - Engineer
 2000 Brand New Day: The Remixes - Sting - Engineer
 2000 Make It Beautiful - Sara Lee - Mixing
 1999 Brand New Day - Sting - Engineer
 1999 Falling Forward - Willy Porter - Engineer, Mixing, Producer
 1998 Black Progress: The Formative Years, Vol. 2 - Bob Marley - Remixing
 1998 Fairytales - Divine - Engineer
 1998 Greatest Hits - Gato Barbieri - Engineer
 1998 Mixed Blessing - William Topley - Producer
 1998 Sultans of Swing: The Very Best of Dire Straits - Dire Straits - Producer
 1997 One Step Up/Two Steps Back: The Songs of Bruce Springsteen - Engineer
 1997 Senegal Moon - Serah - Engineer, Mixing, Producer
 1997 The Best of T-Connection: Everything's Still Cool - T-Connection - Engineer, Mixing
 1997 The Very Best of Sting & the Police - The Police - Mixing, Producer
 1996 Out of the Wind - Serah - Engineer, Mixing
 1996 Bigmouth - Bigmouth - Producer, Engineer, Mixing
 1996 Super Best of Casiopea - Casiopea - Engineer
 1995 (What's the Story) Morning Glory? - Oasis - multichannel mixing (SACD version)
 1995 A Testimonial Dinner: The Songs of XTC - XTC - Engineer
 1995 Cinderella: Tribute to a Classic - Disney - Engineer
 1995 Dog Eared Dream - Willy Porter - Engineer, Mixing, Overdubs, Remixing
 1995 Greatest Hits - Bruce Springsteen - Engineer
 1995 Regarding the Soul - Dee Carstensen - Arranger, Engineer, Mixing, Producer
 1995 The Strangers - The Strangers - Mixing
 1994 Fields of Gold: The Best of Sting 1984-1994 - Sting - Mixing, Producer
 1994 The Collected Recordings: Sixties to Nineties - Tina Turner - Producer
 1993 On the Night - Dire Straits - Engineer, Mixing, Producer
 1993 Screenplaying - Mark Knopfler - Engineer
 1992 Pretty Vultures - Ten Inch Men - Engineer, Producer
 1992 Songs & Crazy Dreams - Paul Brady - Mixing, Producer
 1991 Prince of the Deep Water - The Blessing - Engineer, Mixing, Producer
 1991 Stranger in This Town - Richie Sambora - Producer
 1990 Trick or Treat - Paul Brady - Mixing
 1989 Circle Back Home - Tom Kimmel - Engineer, Mixing, Producer
 1989 Coming in for the Kill - Climie Fisher  - Engineer, Producer
 1989 Flowers in the Dirt - Paul McCartney - Engineer, Mixing, Producer
 1989 Greenpeace: Rainbow Warriors [#1] - Producer
 1989 Strange Angels - Laurie Anderson - Mixing
 1989 The Original Hits - Sylvester - Engineer
 1988 ...Nada Como el Sol - Sting - Producer
 1988 Blues for Buddha - The Silencers - Mixing
 1988 Colin James - Colin James - Mixing
 1988 Everything's Different Now - 'Til Tuesday - Mixing
 1988 Greatest Hits [Arista]- Air Supply - Mixing
 1988 Land of Dreams - Randy Newman - Engineer
 1988 Money for Nothing - Dire Straits - Producer
 1988 Scenes from the Southside - Bruce Hornsby & the Range - Engineer, Mixing, Producer
 1988 Walking through Fire - April Wine- Mixing Engineer
 1987 Coming Around Again - Carly Simon - Engineer
 1987 Englishman in New York: The Ben Liebrand Mix - Sting - Producer
 1987 Jude Cole - Jude Cole - Engineer, Mixing
 1987 Lolita Pop - Lolita Pop - Mixing
 1987 Mercy - Steve Jones - Engineer
 1987 Nothing Like the Sun - Sting - Mixing, Producer
 1986 Daring Adventures - Richard Thompson - Engineer, Mixing
 1986 Secret Dreams & Forbidden Fire - Bonnie Tyler - Mixing
 1986      Rock for Amnesty - Producer
 1986 True for You - Paul Brady - Engineer, Mixing, Percussion, Producer
 1986 Whiplash Smile - Billy Idol - Engineer
 1985 Boys and Girls - Bryan Ferry - Engineer
 1985 Brothers in Arms - Dire Straits - Engineer, Producer
 1984 Cal - Mark Knopfler - Engineer
 1984 Emotion - Barbra Streisand - Engineer
 1983 Faster Than the Speed of Night - Bonnie Tyler - Engineer, Mixing
 1983 Hello Big- Man - Carly Simon - Engineer
 1983 Infidels - Bob Dylan - Engineer
 1983 Lonely at Night - Orphan - Engineer
 1983 Love Over and Over - Kate & Anna McGarrigle - Engineer
 1982 Ignition - John Waite - Assistant Engineer
 1982 Love Over Gold - Dire Straits - Engineer
 1982 On the Line - Gary "U.S." Bonds - Engineer
 1982 Smokin' in the Pit - Steps Ahead - Engineer, Mixing
 1982 The Philip Lynott Album - Phil Lynott - Mixing
 1981 Chances Are - Bob Marley & the Wailers - Engineer, Remixing
 1981 Dedication  - Gary "U.S." Bonds - Engineer
 1981 Wanderlust - Mike Mainieri - Engineer, Mixing
 1980 Carnaval - Spyro Gyra - Engineer
 1980 Diana - Diana Ross - Engineer
 1980 Manhattan Update - Warren Bernhardt - Engineer
 1980 The River - Bruce Springsteen - Engineer
 1979 La Cuna - Ray Barretto - Engineer, Mixing
 1979 Yama - Art Farmer - Engineer
 1978 Heavy Metal Be-Bop - The Brecker Brothers - Assistant Engineer
 1978 Jorge Santana - Jorge Santana - Assistant Engineer
 1978 Stone Blue - Foghat - Remixing
 1978 The Captain's Journey - Lee Ritenour - Assistant Engineer
 1977 Alive II- Kiss - Assistant Engineer
 1977 Love Eyes - Art Webb - Assistant Engineer

Soundtracks
 2000 Dolphins [Original Soundtrack] - Producer
 1995 The Living Sea [Soundtrack from the IMAX film] - Producer
 1995 The Mighty Morphin Power Rangers [Original Soundtrack] - Mixing, Producer
 1994 Four Weddings and a Funeral - Original Soundtrack - Producer
 1992 Hellraiser III: Hell on Earth [Soundtrack] - Randy Miller - Producer
 1991 Backdraft [RCA]- Hans Zimmer - Producer
 1989      She-Devil “Always” [Original Soundtrack] - Producer, Mixing
 1984 Footloose [Original Soundtrack] - Associate Producer, Mixing
 1983 Local Hero [Original Soundtrack] - Mark Knopfler - Engineer

Box Sets/Catalogs
 2014 The Album Collection, Vol. 1: 1973-1984 - Bruce Springsteen - Engineer
 2013 The Complete Album Collection, Vol. 1 - Bob Dylan - Engineer
 2012 The Complete Arista Albums Collection - The Brecker Brothers - Mixing
 2011 The Complete Columbia Albums Collection - Wayne Shorter - Engineer
 2010 The Collection 1973-84 - Bruce Springsteen - Engineer
 2008 Greatest Hits [Steel Box Collection] - Bonnie Tyler - Engineer
 2005 The Collection, Vol. 3: Blonde on Blonde/Blood on the Tracks/Infidels - Bob Dylan - Engineer
 2003 Bob Dylan [Limited Edition Hybrid SACD Set] - Bob Dylan- Engineer
 1998 Tracks - Bruce Springsteen - Engineer

External links 
 www.neildorfsman.com - official page
 Discogs page
 Interview with Mix magazine
 Interview on the making of Brothers in Arms with Sound on Sound

References 

American audio engineers
Record producers from New York (state)
Living people
Grammy Award winners
1952 births